Bernardo O'Higgins National Park is the largest of the protected areas in Chile, covering an area of  in both the Aysén and Magallanes and Antártica Chilena regions. Management of this and other national parks in Chile is entrusted to the Corporación Nacional Forestal (CONAF). The park is named after General Bernardo O'Higgins, the first head of state of the Republic of Chile. Los Glaciares National Park (Argentina) and Torres del Paine National Park are its neighbours to the east, Laguna San Rafael National Park is located to the north, the Alacalufes National Reserve to the southwest and the Katalalixar National Reserve to the northwest.

History
The earliest occupants of the area were the Alacaluf people.

In 1830, the then-Captain Phillip Parker King on board HMS Beagle visited the Eyre Fjord.

In June 2007, it was announced that between March and May 2007 all the water within a glacial lake located within the park had disappeared, leaving behind a 100-foot-deep crater. Only some blocks of ice, previously floating on the lake, remained behind on the crater floor. In July 2007, scientists were able to draw the preliminary conclusion that the disappearance occurred as a result of climate change.

In 2014 the natural sites Chaltén Mountain Range and Pío XI Glacier were created as subdivitions of the natural park.

Geography
The park is located approximately between 48° and 51° 38' South Latitude (between the Baker Channel and the northern part of the Fjord of the Mountains. The east-central area of the park is subject to a territorial dispute between Chile and Argentina. Other summits include the Mount Fitz Roy, the Cerro Torre and the Cerro Riso Patrón. The elevations are lower in the southern part of the park, but the scenery is still spectacular.

There are no large rivers on the park coast, but the narrow fjords penetrate deeply into the mountains and bring away the drainage of their ice-capped, storm-swept elevations.

Geology

Glaciers

The park includes a great part of the Southern Patagonian Ice Field. One of its main attractions is the Glacier Pío XI, from which enormous ice blocks periodically spall. Other outlet glaciers are Chico, O'Higgins, Jorge Montt, Bernardo, Témpano, Occidental, Greve, Penguin and Amalia.

Biology
The area of the park corresponds to the Magellanic subpolar forests ecoregion.
The forests are made up of several trees species, including Nothofagus betuloides, Nothofagus pumilio, Nothofagus antarctica and Drimys winteri.

The park is one of the last refuges for the Chilean huemul. In this also can be found species such as Andean condor, marine otter and cormorant.

Tourism
Because of its rugged geography and the remoteness of the area, the tourism in the park has been scarcely developed. It is only accessible by boat or helicopter. The glaciers located at the head of Última Esperanza Sound and the glacier Pío XI are the most visited areas of the park. The main gateways for visitors to the park are Puerto Natales, Villa O'Higgins, Caleta Tortel and Puerto Edén. Sea kayaking is a popular activity in the park.

See also
Chaltén Mountain Range Natural Site
Base General Bernardo O'Higgins Riquelme
Wellington Island
Zona Austral
Guayaneco Archipelago
O'Higgins Lake

References

External links

 WCS in Chile's O'Higgins National Park

National parks of Chile
Protected areas of Magallanes Region
Protected areas of Aysén Region
Protected areas established in 1969
1969 establishments in Chile
1969 in Chilean law
Magellanic subpolar forests